Sultan Tucker (born 24 October 1978) is a Liberian athlete, specializing in the 110 metres hurdles.

Tucker won a bronze in the 110 metres hurdles at the 2002 African Championships. He also represented Liberia at the World Championships in 2001 and 2005, the World Indoor Championships in 2003 and 2004 and the 2004 Olympic Games, but without reaching the final round.

His personal best time is 13.54 seconds, achieved in May 2004 in Saint-Martin.

External links
 

1978 births
Living people
Liberian male hurdlers
Athletes (track and field) at the 2004 Summer Olympics
Olympic athletes of Liberia
Clemson Tigers men's track and field athletes